Michael J. Cleary (September 23, 1877 – February 21, 1947) was a member of the Wisconsin State Assembly and President of the Northwestern Mutual Life Insurance Company.

Biography and career 
Cleary was born on September 23, 1877 in Blanchardville, Wisconsin or Moscow, Wisconsin. He attended the University of Wisconsin–Madison.

Cleary was elected to the Assembly in 1906 and re-elected in 1908. He was a Republican.

He was an attorney, and worked in insurance and banking in Blanchardville, Wisconsin. He also spent two years as the Chairman of the County Board of Lafayette County, Wisconsin.

He served as Commissioner of Insurance from July 1, 1915 to April 10, 1919. During World War I, he organized a "far reaching and effective food conservation campaign" with a "corps of 125 insurance agents."

He became president of the Northwestern Mutual Life Insurance Company in 1919. He also served as a member of the Board of Regents of the University of Wisconsin and of the Board of Governors of Marquette University.

He died in Milwaukee on February 21, 1947.

References

People from Blanchardville, Wisconsin
Politicians from Milwaukee
County supervisors in Wisconsin
Republican Party members of the Wisconsin State Assembly
University of Wisconsin–Madison alumni
Businesspeople from Milwaukee
American businesspeople in insurance
1877 births
1947 deaths